Nazmie-Lee Marai (born 2 December 1991) is a Papua New Guinean athlete. He competed in the men's 60 metres at the 2018 IAAF World Indoor Championships.

References

External links

1991 births
Living people
Papua New Guinean male sprinters
Place of birth missing (living people)
Athletes (track and field) at the 2018 Commonwealth Games
Commonwealth Games competitors for Papua New Guinea